Stenurothripidae is a family of thrips belonging to the order Thysanoptera.

Genera:
 Cenomanithrips Tong, Shih & Ren, 2019
 Heratythrips Mound & Marullo, 1998
 Hispanothrips Penalver & Nel, 2010
 Holarthrothrips Bagnall, 1927
 Oligothrips Moulton, 1933
 Opadothrips Priesner, 1924
 Stenurothrips Bagnall, 1914

References

Thrips